The 1926 East Renfrewshire by-election was held on 29 January 1926.  The by-election was held due to the appointment as  Solicitor General for Scotland of the incumbent Conservative MP, Alexander Munro MacRobert.  It was won by the Conservative candidate Alexander Munro MacRobert. This was the final ministerial by-election held prior to an amendment to the Re-Election of Ministers Act, which abolished the practice.

References

East Renfrewshire by-election
1920s elections in Scotland
Politics of Renfrewshire
East Renfrewshire by-election
East Renfrewshire by-election
Renfrewshire, East